Proboscidactylidae is a family of cnidarians belonging to the order Anthoathecata.

Genera:
 Pochella Hartlaub, 1917 
 Proboscidactyla Brandt, 1835

References

Filifera
Cnidarian families